The United States National Hockey League (or National Amateur Hockey League) was an amateur ice hockey league that operated in Boston, New York City and Pittsburgh for one season in early 1918.

History
The league consisted of the New York Wanderers, Pittsburgh Athletic Association, Boston Arenas and a team representing the Boston Navy Yard. It formed in January 1918 after the American Amateur Hockey League, in which New York and Boston teams had previously participated, failed to survive the player shortages of World War I. The schedule was drawn up in quadruple round-robin format, with each team slated to play two home and two away games against each of the other teams.

The Pittsburgh Athletic Association won its first ten games to clinch the league title. The team thus earned the right to face the holders of the Art Ross Cup in a three-game international championship series. Pittsburgh defeated the Montreal Hochelaga club in that series to claim a new honor called the Fellowes International Trophy.

At one point during the season, the league's governing body, the International Skating Union of America, was hopeful that the circuit would not only return for the following winter but also expand to Cleveland, Detroit, and possibly Chicago and New Haven. After the season, however, the ammonia needed to operate artificial ice rinks was diverted to wartime munitions production, prompting expectations of lengthy rink closures. Suspension of the league was all but ensured as St. Nicholas Arena in New York was leased out for roller skating and dancing, Pittsburgh's Duquesne Garden was given over for use as a barracks, and the Boston Arena burned down. The league never returned before a new national amateur league was created in 1920 in the form of the United States Amateur Hockey Association.

Final standings
GP = Games Played, W = Wins, L = Losses, T = Ties, GF = Goals For, GA = Goals Allowed

References

Ice hockey leagues in the United States
Sports leagues established in 1918
1918 establishments in the United States
Sports leagues disestablished in 1918
1918 disestablishments in the United States